Cantleya is a genus of plant in the family Stemonuraceae. The sole species is Cantleya corniculata, found in Indonesia and Malaysia.

References

Stemonuraceae
Monotypic asterid genera
Taxonomy articles created by Polbot